Dirceu Wiggers de Oliveira Filho (born 5 January 1988), simply known as Dirceu, is a Brazilian professional footballer who plays as a centre back for Portuguese club U.D. Vilafranquense.

Club career
Dirceu was born in Ibaiti, Paraná. A Coritiba youth graduate, he made his debut as a senior in a derby against Atlético Paranaense in 2008 Campeonato Paranaense.

On 30 December 2008 Dirceu renewed his contract with Coxa, being definitely promoted to the main squad. A defensive midfielder, he was converted into a central defender during the 2009 campaign.

After being rarely used, Dirceu was subsequently loaned to Botafogo-SP and Avaí in 2011, suffering relegation with the latter. In 2012, he represented Nova Iguaçu and América Mineiro, also in temporary deals.

On 7 January 2013 Dirceu was loaned to Londrina, with Arthur moving in the opposite direction. He subsequently had another loan spell at Paysandu, and moved abroad to FC Hoverla Uzhhorod on 25 January 2014.

Nearly a month later Dirceu rescinded with Hoverla and returned to his previous club Londrina, now in a permanent deal. He was a first-choice during his second spell at Tubarão, being also a part of the squad during the club's Campeonato Paranaense winning campaign.

On 27 July 2015, Dirceu signed with C.S. Marítimo. He made his Primeira Liga debut on 13 September, starting in a 5–2 home routing of Vitória de Setúbal.

Dirceu scored his first goal abroad on 15 November 2015, in a 4–2 Taça da Liga away win against C.D. Feirense. Twelve days later he added another, but in a 1–3 loss at C.D. Nacional.

Career statistics

Honours

Club
Coritiba
Campeonato Paranaense: 2008, 2010
Campeonato Brasileiro Série B: 2010

Londrina
Campeonato Paranaense: 2014
Primeira Liga: 2017

Individual
Campeonato Paranaense Best defender: 2013, 2014, 2015

References

External links
 
 

1988 births
Living people
Association football defenders
Brazilian expatriate footballers
Brazilian footballers
Campeonato Brasileiro Série A players
Campeonato Brasileiro Série B players
Campeonato Brasileiro Série C players
Campeonato Brasileiro Série D players
Primeira Liga players
Dirceu Wiggers de Oliveira Filho
Liga Portugal 2 players
Coritiba Foot Ball Club players
FC Hoverla Uzhhorod players
Londrina Esporte Clube players
Nova Iguaçu Futebol Clube players
Paysandu Sport Club players
América Futebol Clube (MG) players
Avaí FC players
Botafogo Futebol Clube (SP) players
C.S. Marítimo players
Figueirense FC players
Dirceu Wiggers de Oliveira Filho
Sportspeople from Paraná (state)
Brazilian expatriate sportspeople in Portugal
Brazilian expatriate sportspeople in Ukraine
Brazilian expatriate sportspeople in Thailand
Expatriate footballers in Portugal
Expatriate footballers in Ukraine
Expatriate footballers in Thailand